The Doll Museum of Castell d'Aro (Museu de la Nina de Castell d'Aro) is a doll monograph collection of the village of Castell d'Aro in Spain. The museum is located in the Nova Llar building, between the Benedormiens Castle (castell de Benedormiens) and the Lluís Companys Square, in the middle of the old town.

Nowadays, this museum is refurbished in order to expand and improve its facilities. It was expected to reopen in 2017.

Origin of the museum 
The museum was founded in 1997 thanks to the donation from Josefina Teixidor. The main aim was to make the doll public as another facet of culture and society.

Description of the museum 
The museum is divided into two different parts. At the ground floor, there is a collection of international dolls, as well as, an exhibition of 245 crocheted dolls, which were donated by the Grau Muntada family. There are also exhibits that have been created exclusively for collectors of the Barbie and D'Antón brands.

At the first floor, there is also the Neus Borrell private collection of antique dolls.

References

External links 
 Baix Empordà Tourism - Museums

1997 establishments in Catalonia
Museums established in 1997
Toy museums in Catalonia
Doll museums
Museums in Baix Empordà